Cutler is an unincorporated community in Hazelton Township, Aitkin County, Minnesota, United States. The community is located between Garrison and Aitkin along U.S. Highway 169 near 240th Street.

References

Unincorporated communities in Aitkin County, Minnesota
Unincorporated communities in Minnesota